Elk Horn Creek is a stream in Cass, Shelby and Audubon counties, Iowa, in the United States.

Elk Horn Creek was so named from the fact settlers saw the bones of an elk near the stream.

See also
List of rivers of Iowa

References

Rivers of Audubon County, Iowa
Rivers of Cass County, Iowa
Rivers of Shelby County, Iowa
Rivers of Iowa